199Quad is the debut studio album by American miami bass group 69 Boyz. It was released in 1994 through Rip-It Records. Recording sessions took place at the Bass Station in Orlando, Florida. Production was handled entirely by 95 South. It features guest appearances from 95 South, Big Tyme and Booty Man. The album reached number 59 on the Billboard 200 and was certified platinum by the Recording Industry Association of America on July 11, 1995 for selling 1,000,000 copies. The album spawned two charted singles: "Tootsee Roll" and "Kitty Kitty", which made it to the Billboard Hot 100 peaking at #8 and #51 respectively.

Track listing

Charts

Weekly charts

Year-end charts

Certifications

References

External links

69 Boyz albums
1994 debut albums